Professor Julienne Christine Stroeve is a polar climate scientist known for her research on remote sensing of ice and snow. She is Professor of Polar Observation & Modelling at the Centre for Polar Observation and Modelling, University College London, Senior Canada-150 Research Chair in Climate Forcing of Sea Ice at the University of Manitoba, and a senior research scientist at the National Snow and Ice Data Center within the Cooperative Institute for Research in Environmental Sciences (CIRES). She is also a member of the American Geophysical Union and an ISI highly cited researcher.

Research 
Professor Stroeve's research has covered Arctic climate change, sea ice decline, atmosphere-ocean ice interactions, remote sensing, and the impact of climate change on native communities. Her recent work has focused on satellite retrievals of Arctic sea ice, and the implications of changing Arctic sea ice on Earth's climate. She has published 162 articles.

Her research has shown that Arctic sea ice decline has happened much faster than models had predicted in recent decades, and that humans may have been the cause of most of this decline. She has also written about the current trend and future predictions of "darkening", or a reduction in albedo, of the Greenland ice sheet through an increase in snow grain size, impurity content of snow, biological activity, exposure of bare ice, formation of melt pools, and the feedbacks associated with these factors. 

Professor Stroeve is a researcher with the MOSAiC Expedition and was aboard the RV Polarstern in mid-winter 2019-2020, where she conducted experiments to assess the accuracy of satellite radar systems used to map sea-ice thickness.

Awards 
Professor Stroeve was awarded the EGU 2020 Julia and Johannes Weertman Medal, for her 'fundamental contributions to improved satellite observations of sea ice, better understanding of causes of sea ice variability and change, and her compelling communication to the wider public'. She is an ISI highly cited researcher, regularly listed as one of Thompson Reuters most highly cited scientists, and a Canada 150 Research Chair at the University of Manitoba.

References

External links

Living people
American climatologists
Women climatologists
American women scientists
Academics of University College London
Women earth scientists
University of Colorado Boulder alumni
Year of birth missing (living people)
American women academics
21st-century American women